Steve Rodby (born December 9, 1954 in Joliet, Illinois) is an American jazz bassist and producer known for his time with the Pat Metheny Group.

Biography
Rodby was born in Joliet, Illinois, into a musical family. His father was a music teacher who bought him an acoustic bass, electric bass, and amp when he was 12. He heard classical music from a young age and was educated in classical until high school when he learned jazz. During high school summers, he went to jazz camps, where he met Pat Metheny, Lyle Mays, and Danny Gottlieb, three of the four members of The Pat Metheny Group.

Rodby played acoustic bass until he graduated from Northwestern University in 1977, when he taught himself how to play electric. He performed in the house band at the Jazz Showcase in Chicago, with local and visiting musicians such as Milt Jackson, Joe Henderson, and Art Farmer. He joined the Pat Metheny Group in 1981, starting on electric bass before spending most of his time on acoustic. He spent the next thirty years at Metheny's side, touring, recording, and producing, in Group projects and in Metheny's other projects. With Metheny he earned multiple Grammy awards and nominations, and admiration from critics, magazines, and reader polls.

Rodby collaborated with Fred Simon and Paul McCandless on two albums: Since Forever and Remember the River. In 2011 he collaborated with Paul Wertico, a former drummer for the Metheny Group, and with Israeli musicians Danny Markovitch and Dani Rabin on Marbin's album Breaking the Cycle.

Since 2018, Rodby has held a position as artist of residence in the faculty of Jazz Studies at the University of Washington in Seattle.

Discography

With Ross Traut
 Great Lawn (Columbia, 1987)
 The Duo Life (Columbia, 1991)

As sideman
With Pat Metheny Group
 Offramp (ECM, 1982) – bassist
 Travels (ECM, 1983) – bassist
 First Circle (ECM, 1984) – bassist
 The Falcon and the Snowman (EMI, 1985) – bassist, conductor
 Still Life (Talking) (Geffen Records, 1987) – bassist, co-producer
 Letter from Home (Geffen Records, 1989) – bassist, co-producer
 The Road to You (Geffen Records, 1993) – bassist, co-producer
 We Live Here (Geffen Records, 1995) – bassist, co-producer
 Quartet (Geffen Records, 1996) – bassist, co-producer
 Imaginary Day (Warner Bros, 1997) – bassist, co-producer
 Speaking of Now (Warner Bros, 2002) – bassist, co-producer
 The Way Up (Nonesuch, 2005) – bassist, co-producer
With Pat Metheny
 Secret Story (Geffen Records, 1992) – bassist, co-producer
 A Map of the World (Warner Bros, 1999) – bassist, co-producer
 Trio 99 → 00 (Warner Bros, 2000) – co-producer
 Trio → Live (Warner Bros, 2000) – co-producer
 Day Trip (Nonesuch, 2008) – co-producer
 Tokyo Day Trip (Nonesuch, 2008) – co-producer
 Orchestrion (Nonesuch, 2010) – co-producer
 Unity Band (Nonesuch, 2012) – co-producer
 The Orchestrion Project (Nonesuch, 2013) – co-producer
 KIN (←→) (Nonesuch, 2014) – co-producer
 The Unity Sessions (Nonesuch, 2016) – co-producer
 From This Place (Nonesuch, 2020) − co-producer
With Simon & Bard Group
 Musaic (Flying Fish, 1980) – bassist
 Tear It Up (Flying Fish, 1982) – bassist
 The Enormous Radio (Flying Fish, 1984) – bassist
With Michael Brecker
 Nearness of You: The Ballad Book (Verve Records, 2001) – co-producer
 Pilgrimage (Heads Up, 2007) – co-producer
With Eliane Elias
 Dreamer (Bluebird, 2004) – co-producer
 Something for You: Eliane Elias Sings & Plays Bill Evans (Blue Note, 2007) – co-producer
 Bossa Nova Stories (Blue Note, 2009) – co-producer
 Light My Fire (Concord Picante, 2011) – co-producer
 I Thought About You (Concord Jazz, 2013) – co-producer
 Made In Brazil (Concord Jazz, 2015) – co-producer, recorded
 Dance of Time (Concord Jazz, 2017) – co-producer
 Love Stories (Concord Jazz, 2019) – co-producer
 Mirror Mirror (Candid, 2021) – co-producer
 Quietude (Candid, 2022) – co-producer

With Lyle Mays
 Street Dreams (Geffen Records, 1988) – bassist, co-producer, conductor
 Fictionary (Geffen Records, 1993) – co-producer
 Solo (Improvisations For Expanded Piano) (Geffen Records, 2000) – co-producer
 Eberhard (KMG Distribution, 2021) - bassist, co-producer
With Pat Coil
 Schemes And Dreams (Sheffield Lab, 1994) – bassist, co-producer
 Gold (Sheffield Lab, 1996) – bassist
With Fred Simon
 Usually/Always (Windham Hill Records, 1988) - bassist, producer, editing
 Open Book (Columbia, 1991) – bassist, co-producer
 Remember the River by (Naim, 2004) – bassist
 Since Forever (Naim, 2009) – bassist, producer, editing
With Steve Cole
 Spin (Narada Jazz, 2005) – bassist
 True (Narada Jazz, 2005) - bassist
With Paul McCandless
 Heresay (Windham Hill Records, 1988) – bassist
 Premonition (Windham Hill Records, 1992) – bassist, producer
 Navigator (Landslide Records, 1994) – bassist
With others
 Madelaine, Who Is She... (United Artists Records, 1978) – bassist
 John Prine, Bruised Orange (Asylum Records, 1978) – bassist
 Jimmy Raney, For You To Play . . . Ten Favorite Jazz Standards, Volume 20 (JA Records, 1979) – bassist
 Jamey Aebersold, Gettin' It Together (JA Records, 1979) – bassist
 Ramsey Lewis, Ramsey (Columbia, 1979) – bassist
 Tyrone Davis, I Just Can't Keep On Going (Columbia, 1980) – bassist
 Ross Traut, Ross Traut (Headfirst, 1981) – bassist
 Chuck Mangione, Save Tonight For Me (Columbia, 1986) – bassist
 Tom Paxton, And Loving You (Flying Fish, 1986) – bassist
 Fareed Haque, Voices Rising (PAND, 1988) – bassist
 Toninho Horta, Moonstone (Verve/Forecast, 1989) - bassist
 Montreux, Let Them Say (Windham Hill Records, 1989) – mixing, producer
 Michael Manring, Drastic Measures (Windham Hill Records, 1991) – bassist,  producer
 Noa, Noa (Geffen Records, 1994) – bassist, co-producer
 Clifford Carter, Walkin' Into The Sun (Soul Coast, 1994) – bassist
 Kim Pensyl, Quiet Cafe (Fahrenheit Records, 1998) – bassist
 Jim Hall & Pat Metheny, (Telarc, 1999) – co-producer
 Oregon, Oregon in Moscow (Intuition, 2000) – producer
 Brian Culbertson, Come On Up (Warner Bros. Records, 2003) – bassist
 Simon Apple, River To The Sea (Trunk Records, 2004) – bassist
 Lisa Lauren, Loves The Beatles (Planet Jazz Records, 2006) – bassist
 Charlie Haden, Rambling Boy (Universal, 2008) – co-producer
 Esperanza Spalding, Radio Music Society (Heads Up, 2012) – mix preparation
 Ryan Cohan, The River (Motéma Music, 2013) – producer
 Marbin, Last Chapter Of Dreaming (Moonjune Records, 2013) – bassist
 The Impossible Gentlemen, Internationally Recognized Aliens (Basho, 2013) – bassist, producer
 Tyrone Davis, Love And Touch (Solid Records, 2015) – strings
 John Moulder, Earthborn Tales Of Soul And Spirit (Origin Records, 2016) – bassist

Grammy Awards
With Pat Metheny Group:
 Best Jazz Fusion Performance, Vocal or Instrumental – Offramp
 Best Jazz Fusion Performance, Vocal or Instrumental – Travels
 Best Jazz Fusion Performance, Vocal or Instrumental – First Circle
 Best Jazz Fusion Performance, Vocal or Instrumental – Still Life (Talking)
 Best Jazz Fusion Performance – Letter From Home
 Best Contemporary Jazz Performance Instrumental – The Road to You
 Best Contemporary Jazz Performance Instrumental – We Live Here
 Best Contemporary Jazz Performance – Imaginary Day
 Best Rock Instrumental Performance – "The Roots of Coincidence"
 Best Contemporary Jazz Album – Speaking of Now
 Best Contemporary Jazz Album – The Way Up

References 

American jazz double-bassists
Male double-bassists
American jazz bass guitarists
American male bass guitarists
Bienen School of Music alumni
1954 births
Living people
Musicians from Joliet, Illinois
Grammy Award winners
Pat Metheny Group members
Guitarists from Illinois
20th-century American bass guitarists
Jazz musicians from Illinois
21st-century double-bassists
20th-century American male musicians
21st-century American male musicians
American male jazz musicians